Dan Christian Ghattas is an intersex activist, university lecturer and author who co-founded OII Europe in 2012 and is now executive director. In 2013, he authored Human Rights between the Sexes, a first comparative international analysis of the human rights situation of intersex people.

Career 

In 2018, Ghattas was appointed as the first executive director of OII Europe. He is formerly a university lecturer and cultural scientist. He has a PhD in medieval culture.

Activism 

Ghattas started working on intersex human rights in 2009. Alongside Miriam van der Have, he became a co-chair of OII Europe, and later executive director, speaking at events across Europe including the launch of a Council of Europe issue paper on "Human rights and intersex people" in Montenegro. He has provided expertise to a range of institutions, including the Maltese government, the Parliament of the European Union, the UN Office of the High Commissioner for Human Rights and the Committee on the Rights of Persons with Disabilities.

Ghattas has participated in all four International Intersex Forums, and helped to initiate the first forum. In 2015, Ghattas joined an international advisory board for a first philanthropic Intersex Human Rights Fund established by the Astraea Lesbian Foundation for Justice. Ghattas is also a bridge builder advisor to the Disability Rights Fund.

Works 

Ghattas has written or co-edited multiple books. He authored Human Rights between the Sexes or Menschenrechte zwischen den Geschlechtern, published in English and German in 2013 by the Heinrich Böll Foundation. The report is believed to be the first comparative international analysis of the human rights of intersex people; it found that intersex people are discriminated against worldwide. Earlier, in 2012, he co-authored a first study into the lives of trans people in Germany, entitled Studie zur Lebenssituation von Transsexuellen in Nordrhein-Westfalen.

Selected bibliography

Books and book chapters

Editorials

See also 

 OII Europe
 Human Rights between the Sexes

References 

Living people
Intersex rights activists
Intersex rights in Germany
Year of birth missing (living people)
Intersex academics
Intersex writers
21st-century LGBT people